James Wilson (1774? – 24 April 1829) was an Irish mathematician whose career was spent at Trinity College Dublin (TCD). He was born in Dublin, his father being William, and was brought up there. He studied at TCD, graduating BA (1794), MA (1800) and later BD & DD (1811).

While at TCD he was elected a Fellow (1800), was Donegall Lecturer (1807–1820), and Erasmus Smith's Professor of Mathematics (1822–1825). He spent his final years as Rector of Clonfeacle (Tyrone) (1825–1829).

References

Sources
 Burtchaell, G. D., and Sadleir, T. U. (eds), Alumni Dublinensis: A Register of the Students, Graduates, Professors and Provosts of Trinity College in the University of Dublin, 1593–1860 (Dublin, 1935)
 Mathematics at TCD 1592–1992 TCD School of Mathematics: The Eighteenth Century  
 The Dublin University Calendar For The Year 1877 TCD School of Mathematics
 Armagh clergy and parishes compiled by James B. Leslie

Academics of Trinity College Dublin
Donegall Lecturers of Mathematics at Trinity College Dublin
Fellows of Trinity College Dublin
Irish mathematicians
1774 births
1829 deaths